Sayyid Parviz Fattah is an Iranian conservative politician, former member of Revolutionary Guard and former minister of energy in Mahmoud Ahmadinejad's first cabinet from 2005 to 2009. He is former head of Imam Khomeini Relief Foundation from 2015 to 2019. He is currently head of Mostazafan Foundation from 22 July 2019.

Early life and education
Born in Urmia in 1961, he has the license of Civil engineering from Sharif University of Technology, a master's degree in systems engineering from Amirkabir University of Technology in Tehran and PhD from Imam Hossein University in Tehran.

Career
Fattah was appointed energy minister in 2005 and approved by the Majlis with 194 votes in favor. He was in office until 2009. Then he became the executive director of the foundation, Bonyad Taavon Sepah, which is the IRGC's cooperative foundation He was also named deputy commander of the IRGC's construction body, Khatam ol Anbia.

Sanctions
The US Treasury Department put sanctions on Fattah in December 2010 due to his activities in the Bonyad Taavon Sepah that provides services to the IRGC. He was also sanctioned by the U.S. Treasury in November 2020 for his connections to Supreme Leader Ali Khamenei.

References

1961 births
Living people
People from Urmia
Government ministers of Iran
Imam Hossein University alumni
Amirkabir University of Technology alumni
Sharif University of Technology alumni
Iranian civil engineers
Front of Islamic Revolution Stability politicians
Islamic Revolutionary Guard Corps officers
Iranian individuals subject to the U.S. Department of the Treasury sanctions